Lasbela District (Urdu and , Sindhi Lasi: لسبيلو) is a coastal district of Balochistan province of Pakistan. It is also called Sassi-Punnu Garh among locals.

History 
Alexander the Great passed through Lasbela on his way back to Babylon after conquering Northwestern India. In 711 CE, the Arab general. Muhammad bin Qasim passed through Lasbela on his way to Sindh. The area of the district was formerly a princely state of British India, which later merged with Pakistan. The name is derived from the words Las which signifies a plain the greater part of the area being a flat plain, and Bela which means "jungle" and is also the name of the principal town of this district. State of Las Bela has an area of 18,254 km². Capital: Las Bela. Languages: Balochi and Sindhi.

1742, Las Bela State refounded

Las Bela (Area: 15,472 km) accedes to Pakistan

joins Balochistan States Union state stinguished,

17 Mar 1948, Las Bela (Area: 15,472 km) accedes to Pakistan

03 Oct 1952, joins Balochistan States Union

14 Oct 1955, state stinguished.

JAMOT, Kathuria segment (titles: Jam Saheb)

Ali Khan 1............................................1742 - 1765

Ghulam Shah.........................................1765-1776

Wir Khan I............................................1776 - 1818

Ali Khan I.............................................1818 - 1830

Mir Khan II...........................................1830 - 1869

1869 saw the death and defeat of the ruler of Lasbela, Jam Mir Khan, near Khuzdar. He is reported to have started a rebellion by the inhabitants of Jhalawan under the supervision of Nur ud-din Mengal. Gauhar Khan, the chief of Zehri tribe and his sons, who started a resistance movement against Mir Khudadad's rule were defeated and killed by Kalat's army at Garmap. The uprising started in 1893 and continued until 1895.

Ali Khan III(1st)................................. 1869 - 1886

He was born in 1849 and died in 1896,

Mir Khan III............................................1886 - 1888

Ali Khan III(2nd)........................21 Jan 1888 - 1896

Kamal Khan...................................May 1896 - 1921

Mir Ghulam Mohammad Khan.....Mar 1921 - 1937.

He was born in 1895 and died in 1937,

Mir Ghulam Qadir than Alian 1937-14 Oct 1955.

Lasbela was notified as a district on 30 June 1954. In October, 1955 the unification of the former provinces of Punjab, NWFP, Sindh and Balochistan took place. The Balochistan States Union was formed into Kalat division. In 1960, the area of Las Bela was detached from Kalat division and merged with the former Federal Capital Territory to form the division of Karachi-Bela. When the provincial system was changed in 1970, Las Bela became part of the new province of Balochistan.

He was born in 1920 and served as Chief Minister of Baluchistan from 1973 to 1974 and again from 1985 to 1988. He also served as Health Minister of Pakistan as well as being the Speaker of the Balochistan Provincial Assembly. He died in 1988.

Mir Mohannad Yousaf Khan Aliani (ren) 1988-date

He is the son of Jam Mir Ghulam Qadir and also served as Chief Minister of Balochistan from Dec 2002 to Nov 2007. His elder son Prince Jam Kamal Khan Aliani is the Nazim (mayor) of the District Council of Lasbela District in Pakistan. The famous Hinglaj Mata mandir, a Hindu holy site located in the Hingol National Park, is situated in Lasbela district. The annual Hinglaj Yathra where more than 250,000 Hindu devotees participate every year.

Administration
The district of Lasbela is administratively divided in four tehsils one sub-tehsil and 22 Union Councils.

 Uthal
 Bela
 Lakhra
 Kanraj
 Sub-Tehsil Liari

Union Councils are given below:

Tehsil Uthal
 Uthal
 Wayara 
 Kenwari 
 Lakhra
 Sheh

Tehsil Bela
 Bela 
 Welpat Shumali 
 Welpat Junubi 
 Kathor 
 Gador

Geography
The main rivers of Lasbela are Porali River with its tributaries, Winder River and Wirhab River. Other rivers are the Phor and Hingol which rise in Awaran District before flowing through Lasbela on their way to the Arabian Sea.

Demographics
At the time of the 2017 census the district had a population of 236,631, of which 123,639 were males and 112,986 females. Rural population was 182,605 (77.17%) while the urban population was 54,026 (22.83%). The literacy rate was 32.47% - the male literacy rate was 43.49% while the female literacy rate was 20.25%. Islam was the predominant religion with 98.38%, while Hindus are 1.44% of the population.

At the time of the 2017 census, 53.14% of the population spoke Sindhi (including the Lasi dialect), 34.31% Balochi, 9.05% Brahui and 1.47% Pashto as their first language.

Education
The Lasbela University of Agriculture, Water and Marine Science is located in Uthal.

Economy
In the south east, an oil refinery Cnergyico was constructed in 2014 at Hub in Lasbela District which is capable of processing 120,000 barrels of oil. Furthermore, a power station is located adjacent to refinery, that produces about 1350 MW of power.

Bibliography

References

External links

 Lasbela District at Balochistan Government website

 
Districts of Pakistan
Districts of Balochistan, Pakistan